Puducherry Lok Sabha constituency  covers the entire Union Territory of Puducherry. Pondicherry became a union territory after the implementation of the Fourteenth Amendment of the Constitution of India in 1962 and changed its name to Puducherry in 2006. This constituency first held elections in 1967 and its first member of parliament (MP) was Thirumudi N. Sethuraman of the Indian National Congress (INC).

History of the constituency
Sethuraman represented the Indian National Congress (Organisation) in the 1971 election, which he lost to Mohan Kumaramangalam of the INC. The next election in 1977 was won by Aravinda Bala Pajanor of the All India Anna Dravida Munnetra Kazhagam (AIADMK). P. Shanmugam of the INC won the 1980 election and was re-elected in 1984 and 1989. M. O. H. Farook also of the INC served two terms from 1991 to 1998. In the 1998 election, S. Arumugham of the Dravida Munnetra Kazhagam (DMK) was elected as MP. Farook was re-elected in 1999 to serve a third term as MP. The next election in 2004 was won by M. Ramadass of the Pattali Makkal Katchi (PMK). V. Narayanasamy of the INC was elected in 2009 and was defeated in the next election in 2014 by R. Radhakrishnan of the All India N.R. Congress. Radhakrishnan's victory was the first time that the Lok Sabha seat was won by a member of a Puducherry regional party. In the 2019 Lok Sabha elections Indian National Congress candidate V. Vaithilingam defeated All India N.R. Congress candidate Dr. Narayanasamy Kesavan by a record margin of 1,97,025 votes, this margin is the highest in the electoral history of Puducherry Parliamentary Constituency. Indian National Congress is the most successful party in this constituency by winning 10 out of 14 elections, in the other 4 elections, 2 times in 1977 and 2004 Indian National Congress party's alliance partners All India Anna Dravida Munnetra Kazhagam (AIADMK) and Pattali Makkal Katchi (PMK) won respectively.

Prior to independence, the colony sent a member to the French National Assembly.

Assembly segments 
The constituency presently comprises all the thirty segments of the Puducherry Legislative Assembly.

Members of Parliament

Election results

General election 1967

General election 1971

General election 1977

General election 1980

General election 1984

General election 1989

General election 1991

General election 1996

General election 1998

General election 1999

General election 2004

General election 2009

General election 2014

General election 2019

See also
 List of Constituencies of the Lok Sabha
 Puducherry Legislative Assembly
 List of Chief Ministers of Puducherry
 List of Rajya Sabha members from Puducherry

References
 Puducherry Lok Sabha Election 2019 Results Website

Constituencies of the Lok Sabha
Lok Sabha
Elections in Puducherry